The International Table Soccer Federation (ITSF) is a non-profit organization based in France that promotes table soccer. The ITSF endorses soccer tables that meet requirements for international competition.

The five official tables are currently furnished by Bonzini, Garlando, Roberto Sport, Tornado (table football), and Leonhart, with the ITSF recognising a number of other tables (Warrior Table Soccer, Fireball, Rosengart, Jupiter, Metegol) - as being suitable for national competition.

Membership

There are two membership categories that ITSF operates - Regular and Associate. The categories differ in the list of required standards, like membership fees, up-to-date registers of national clubs and venues, the number of ITSF-sanctioned tournaments, the general understanding of table football as a sport etc.

While Regular Members are mature federations, Associate Members should be able to demonstrate the potential to develop table football to the level of a Regular Member.

Current Regular Members

The Associate members include: Australia, Bangladesh, China, Georgia, Hong Kong, India, Malaysia, Nepal, Pakistan, Singapore, South Korea, United Arab Emirates, Benin, Cameroon, Congo, South Africa, Croatia, Finland, Hungary, Latvia, Poland, Romania, Russia, Turkey, Ukraine, Mexico, United States, Argentina, Bolivia, Brazil, Chile, Colombia.

Tournaments
The ITSF does not organize most of the events that come under its banner. ITSF organizes the Multi-Table World Championships and World Cup, which takes place bi-annually. Entry to the championships is earned by winning (or placing very highly in) one of the official table type World Championships; by accruing enough ranking points over a number of smaller events that meet ITSF's strict criteria for events; or by becoming a national champion of a member country.

ITSF ranking tournaments are restricted in number to each member country, and ranking status is awarded based around standard of entry expected, number of players entering and prize money to be awarded.

References

External links
Official Website

 

Bonzini Website, ITSF Approved Table Manufacturer and Sponsor
Garlando Website, ITSF Approved Table Manufacturer and Sponsor
Warrior Table Soccer Website, ITSF Recognized Manufacturer and Sponsor

International sports organizations
Sports organizations of France
Table football organizations